Springfield is a census-designated place (CDP) in Fairfax County, Virginia, United States. The Springfield CDP is recognized by the U.S. Census Bureau with a population of 30,484 as of the 2010 census. Homes and businesses in bordering CDPs including North Springfield, West Springfield, and Newington are usually given a Springfield mailing address. The population of the collective areas with Springfield addresses is estimated to exceed 100,000. The CDP is a part of Northern Virginia, the most populous region of the Washington Metropolitan Area.

Geography
Springfield is located at  (38.779238, −77.184636).

According to the United States Census Bureau, the CDP has a total area of 7.9 square miles (20.4 km2), of which, 7.9 square miles (20.3 km2) of it is land and 0.04 square miles (0.1 km2) of it (0.49%) is water.

The area is dominated by the interchange of I-95, I-395, and the Capital Beltway (I-495), known as the Springfield Interchange. The center of the town is at the intersection of Route 644 (Old Keene Mill Road / Franconia Road) and Route 617 (Backlick Road) adjacent to the interchange. A significant commercial district exists around the interchange area, but the rest of the community is primarily residential in character.

According to the U.S. Postal Service, Springfield collectively has four ZIP codes:

 22150 (often unofficially referred to as Central Springfield, this is the zip code for the actual Springfield CDP itself.)
 22151 (North Springfield)
 22152 (West Springfield)
 22153 (Newington)

The following are total area, water area, and land area statistics (in square miles) for the four Springfield zip codes:

History
A saw and grist mill was constructed in the vicinity of what is today Springfield between 1796 and 1800. Owned by James Keene, it gave its name to today's Old Keene Mill Road. The mill served farms in the area for around sixty years before its discontinuation when William H. Keene was convicted and imprisoned for the 1855 murder of Lewis Quincy Hall. Nothing remains of it today save for two mill races.

Springfield was founded in 1847 around the Orange and Alexandria Railroad's Daingerfield Station; this is today the Backlick Road Virginia Railway Express station, located off Backlick Road. The area was named for "Springfield Farm", owned by Henry Daingerfield, an Alexandria businessman who sat on the railroad's board of directors. The post office was completed sometime after 1851. It was in existence at the time of the American Civil War, being the site of a skirmish on October 3, 1861 and a Confederate raid on August 3, 1863. The station served as the first Springfield Post Office from 1866 to 1868.

In 1877, Richard Moore petitioned for a post office, which he named Moor; it was located about a little over a mile south of the station, near the intersection of Fairfax (now Old Keene Mill) and Backlick roads. The post office name was changed in 1881 to Garfield to honor the late President James A. Garfield, who had been assassinated that year. In 1907, the Garfield post office closed and a new postal station named Corbett (after the then-landowner) opened back at the railroad station. The name "Springfield" was reinstated for good on June 27, 1910, although the name Garfield continued to appear on maps at least through the 1930s. The post office was moved to a new site in 1933.

Springfield remained a rural crossroads until 1946, when real estate developer Edward Carr decided to subdivide the area for suburban development along the recently opened Henry Shirley Highway (now I-95/I-395). Carr believed this to be the last easily accessible tract within  of Washington, D.C., and indeed, the newly developed area grew quickly. In 1950, the area had an estimated population of 1,000;   Robert E. Lee High School was built in 1957. By 1960, the population was reported as over 10,000; it grew past 25,000 by 1970 with the North and West Springfield neighborhoods.

Springfield became a major retail destination with the opening of the Springfield Mall (now Springfield Town Center) in 1973–75 (the second regional shopping center in Northern Virginia after Tysons Corner), as well as the Springfield and Brookfield shopping centers. The 1980s and 1990s saw the expansion of retail and high-density housing in the area, at least until the opening of the Franconia-Springfield Parkway in 1996, and the Franconia-Springfield Metro and Virginia Rail Express Station in 1997. The mall was renovated and re-opened in 2014.

The center of Springfield is at Route 644 (Old Keene Mill Road / Franconia Road) and Route 617. The old "Garfield" name still survives in the nearby Garfield Elementary School.

The Sydenstricker School, completed in 1928, was listed on the National Register of Historic Places in 2012.

Demographics

As of the census of 2010, there were 30,484 people, 12,431 houses, and 7,472 families residing in the Springfield CDP. The racial makeup of the CDP was 48.7% White, 9.0% African American, 0.7% Native American, 24.3% Asian, 0.1% Pacific Islander, 12.5% from other races, and 4.7% from two or more races. Hispanic or Latino of any race were 25.5% of the population.

As of 2000, there were 10,495 households, out of which 32.9% had children under the age of 18 living with them, 58.0% were married couples living together, 8.9% had a female householder with no husband present, and 28.8% were non-families. 22.1% of all households were made up of individuals, and 7.7% had someone living alone who was 65 years of age or older. The average household size was 2.88 and the average family size was 3.37. As of 2010, the average household size was 2.82.

In the Springfield CDP, the population was spread out, with 22.5% under the age of 18, 8.0% from 18 to 24, 34.2% from 25 to 44, 23.2% from 45 to 64, and 11.2% who were 65 years of age or older. The median age was 36 years. For every 100 females, there were 99.2 males. For every 100 females age 18 and over, there were 96.5 males.

The median income for a household in the Springfield CDP as of 2010 was $84,309, and the median income for a family was $95,158. In 2000, males had a median income of $45,679 versus $36,075 for females. The per capita income for the CDP was $36,405.

The zip code population totals for the entire Springfield community (as defined by USPS) were as follows:

 22150: 22,208
 22151: 16,587
 22152: 28,236
 22153: 33,177
 Total: 100,208

Public safety
The Greater Springfield Volunteer Fire Department's fire station at 7011 Backlick Road provides fire and EMS services to Springfield.

The West Springfield District Police Station of the Fairfax County Police Department is at 6140 Rolling Road.

Shopping

Springfield Mall was a large indoor shopping mall near the Springfield Interchange, the intersection of Interstate highways I-95 and I-495. It contained several anchor stores and a food court. In 2001, two of the hijackers in the September 11 attacks, Hani Hanjour and Khalid al-Mihdhar, illegally obtained state identification at the mall's DMV office. In 2005, gang members stabbed two people at the mall. and a fatal shooting occurred in December 2007.

In 2005, the mall was purchased by Vornado Realty Trust, which closed the structure, renovated and reopened it in 2014 as "Springfield Town Center".

Transportation

Roads
Central Springfield is dominated by the Springfield Interchange, popularly known as the "Mixing Bowl" or the "Melting Pot", a name taken from an earlier interchange near the Pentagon. The interchange includes three Interstates (I-95, I-395, and I-495), with two exits less than a half mile apart, with two roads (Commerce Street and Route 644 (Old Keene Mill Road / Franconia Road)) going over or under I-95 within less than a half mile, and is further complicated by the presence of a separate, reversible high-occupancy vehicle lane passing through the center of two of the interstates.

Built between 1999 and 2007 at a cost of $676 million, the Springfield Interchange Improvement Project was finished on time and on budget, according to the Virginia Department of Transportation, and dedicated on July 18, 2007, by Virginia Governor Timothy M. Kaine.

Mass transit

Rail

 Virginia Railway Express commuter rail at the Backlick Road station
 Washington Metro's Blue Line at the Franconia-Springfield station

Bus
 Fairfax Connector bus
Greyhound bus
 BestBus
 Washington Metropolitan Area Transit Authority bus
 OmniRide bus

Airports
The closest airport to Springfield is the Ronald Reagan Washington National Airport, in Arlington, Virginia. Other airports include the Washington Dulles International Airport, located in Chantilly and Sterling, Virginia, as well as Baltimore-Washington International Thurgood Marshall Airport in Linthicum, Maryland.

Economy
The corporate headquarters of Ensco are physically located in the Ravensworth census-designated place, with a Springfield postal address.

Education
Public schools in Springfield are run by Fairfax County Public Schools.

Some Springfield neighborhoods feed schools outside the census-designated place limits, such as the Lake Braddock, South County, and Hayfield districts. Likewise, some Springfield schools are fed by neighborhoods outside the CDP limits.

Elementary schools serving the Springfield area include: Cardinal Forest Elementary School (in West Springfield CDP), Crestwood Elementary School, Garfield Elementary School, Forestdale Elementary School, Hunt Valley Elementary School, Keene Mill Elementary School (West Springfield CDP), Kings Glen Elementary School, Kings Park Elementary School (in Kings Park CDP), Lynbrook Elementary School, Newington Forest Elementary School, North Springfield Elementary School (in North Springfield CDP), Orange Hunt Elementary School, Ravensworth Elementary School (in Ravensworth CDP), Rolling Valley Elementary School (West Springfield CDP), Sangster Elementary School, Springfield Estates Elementary School, Saratoga Elementary School, and West Springfield Elementary School (West Springfield CDP).

Middle schools serving Springfield include Francis Scott Key Middle School and Washington Irving Middle School (West Springfield CDP).

High schools serving Springfield include Robert E. Lee High School and West Springfield High School in West Springfield CDP; the latter is home to the West Springfield Dance Team, which appeared on the television show America's Got Talent.

Private schools in the vicinity of Springfield include St. Bernadette School (of the Roman Catholic Diocese of Arlington) in West Springfield CDP, Springfield Academy, the Word of Life Christian Academy, Iqra Elementary, and Al-Qalam Academy.

The medical campus of Northern Virginia Community College is located in Springfield. It offers a variety of associates degrees and certificates.

Notable people 

 Dave Albo, former member of the Virginia House of Delegates
 José Alegría, Peruvian-born footballer
 Doug Bandow, political writer
 Warren E. Barry, former member of the Virginia General Assembly
 Brian Birdwell, member of the Texas Senate
 Larry Bond, author and video game designer
 Antonio Bustamante, footballer
 Brian Carroll, footballer
 Mike Caussin, NFL player
 Suzanne Marie Collins, military officer and murder victim
 Meghan Cox, footballer
 Jeffrey Davidow, diplomat
 William Drohan, educator and microbiologist
 Jannik Eckenrode, footballer
 Obi Enechionyia, basketball player
 Eileen Filler-Corn, member and speaker of the Virginia House of Delegates
 Patrick G. Forrester, retired Army officer and astronaut
 Robert Girardi, author of military and detective fiction
 Dave Grohl, musician; member of Nirvana and co-founder of Foo Fighters
 Gary Groth, comic book publisher, editor, and critic
 Ashley Johnson and Kelley Johnson, footballers
 Rob Keefe, AFL coach
 Kara Lawson, head coach of the Duke Blue Devils women's basketball team, former WNBA player, graduate of West Springfield High School
 Lowell C. Kilday, diplomat
 Jose Llana, singer and Broadway actor
 Chip Rives, businessman and former athlete
 Kevin Schneider, officer in the United States Air Force
 Robert L. Schweitzer, United States Army general
 Mohammed Seisay, NFL player
 Thomas P. Shoesmith, diplomat
 Tracy Stone-Manning, environmental policy advisor
 Virginia Thrasher, sports shooter
 Christina Tosi, chef, author, and TV personality
 Ross H. Trower, rear admiral and chaplain in the United States Navy
 Bobby Wahl, MLB pitcher

Library
The Fairfax County Public Library system operates the Richard Byrd Library.

References

External links

 Springfield District-Fairfax County, Virginia
 Springfield Town Center
 Springfield Then and Now, Jack Lewis Hiller, Chronicle Newspapers, August 2005
 William Fairfax Will Transcript, Recorded in Fairfax County Deed Book B1 page 177, Fairfax County Circuit court

 
Census-designated places in Fairfax County, Virginia
Census-designated places in Virginia
Washington metropolitan area
Populated places established in 1847
1847 establishments in Virginia